Poskær Stenhus is the largest round barrow in Denmark, dating back to 3.300 B.C. It is by the village Knebel on the hilly southern part of the peninsula, Djursland, at the entrance to the Baltic Sea between Denmark and Sweden in northern Europe. The central burial chamber is equipped with a capstone weighing , surrounded by 23 slabs taller than a man, forming a circle.
 
 
The capstone is the lesser half of a granite slab brought to Denmark from Northern Scandinavia by ice age glaciers' movements. The underside is remarkably flat, and possibly split from another half, by the dolmen builders. The other half is a  slab  to the northwest, placed as a capstone on another dolmen, Agri Dyssen. How these slabs were transported and erected by Stone Age people is not known.

Apart from Denmark's easternmost island, Bornholm, the country has no bedrock. Therefore, large granite slabs have been sought out for construction purposes and many dolmens have disappeared or been damaged.

In 1859 a landowner, Ole Hansen, attempted to dynamite slabs from Poskær Stenhus. A local priest started a process to stop the destruction of the burial site, ending with an official protection of the site in 1860. As part of this, Hansen was given a compensation of 100 rigsdaler. A broken slab-part with drill-marks from dynamiting at the barrow gives witness to his endeavor. At least one slab was destroyed before the site was protected.

Literature 
 Palle Eriksen, Poskær Stenhus – myter og virkelighed, Moesgård Museum, 1999. .

References

External links 

 Poskær Stenhus – Danmarks største runddysse – Nationalpark Mols Bjerge
 Poskær Stenhus, Reddet fra sprængstof  – 1001 fortællinger om Danmark

Syddjurs Municipality
National parks of Denmark
Protected areas of Denmark
Tourist attractions in the Central Denmark Region